Hieracium fulvescens is a species of flowering plant belonging to the family Asteraceae.

Its native range is Northern and Eastern Europe.

References

fulvescens